The Jock River, known locally as the Mighty Jock, is a river in Ottawa and Lanark County in Eastern Ontario, Canada. It is in the Saint Lawrence River drainage basin and is a left tributary of the Rideau River. The river is named after Jacques, a French man who drowned in it in the early 19th century, and it was once known as the Goodwood River. The River is supported by a community-volunteer organization known as the Friends of the Jock River.

Course
The river begins in the municipality of Montague in Lanark County. It flows north under the Canadian Pacific Railway main line into the municipality of Beckwith, passes under Ontario Highway 15 and past the community of Franktown into the Goodwood Marsh. It then turns east into the City of Ottawa at the community of Ashton, flows through the community of Richmond, heads under Ontario Highway 416, and reaches its mouth at the Rideau river north of the community of Manotick.

The Jock River watershed drains  of land.

Jock River Canoe Race
For one weekend each spring, the popular Annual Jock River Canoe Race is held between Munster Road and the town of Richmond, covering  of the river mostly through the Richmond Fen. The race, held since 1985, has grown to include now many classes of competition, such as solo and tandem canoeing and kayaking, recreational, mixed, and family.

The race is usually held in early spring to take advantage of the high water level. The race course has a few sections of Class I whitewater.

Tributaries
Nichols Creek (right)
Kings Creek (right)

References

Sources

External links
Watershed Planning — Jock River Watershed at the Rideau Valley Conservation Authority
Jock River Canoe Race
Friends of the Jock River

Rivers of Ottawa
Rivers of Lanark County